Robert F. Swinnie Airport  is a public airport located two miles (3 km) east of the central business district of Andrews, a town in Georgetown County, South Carolina, United States. It is owned by Georgetown County. The airport serves the general aviation community, with no scheduled commercial airline service.

Although most U.S. airports use the same three-letter location identifier for the FAA and IATA, Robert F. Swinnie Airport is assigned PHH by the FAA and ADR by the IATA.

Facilities and aircraft 
For the 12-month period ending 9 October 2019, the airport had 4,000 aircraft operations, 100% of which were general aviation. The airport served as the base for 7 single-engine aircraft and one ultra-light vehicle.

References

External links 

Airports in South Carolina
Buildings and structures in Georgetown County, South Carolina
Transportation in Georgetown County, South Carolina